The Daimler-Benz DB 600 was a German aircraft engine designed and  built before World War II as part of a new generation of German engine technology. It was a liquid-cooled inverted V12 engine, and powered the Messerschmitt Bf 110 and Heinkel He 111 among others.

Development
Most newer DB engine designs used in WW2 were based on this engine. The RLM made a set of specifications listing the technologies which the new class of German aero-engines required. Among these items was fuel injection systems rather than carburettors. Knowing that this would take some years to implement, the RLM permitted that the manufacturers could first design and produce the basic engine, and later develop it to include the injection system. The DB 600 formed this function (having in turn been developed from the Daimler-Benz F4A and F4B V12s), therefore when the injection system was ready it meant that the DB 600 was replaced by the otherwise similar DB 601, which in addition to direct fuel injection, also added the variable speed supercharger. Later DB series engines grew in bore, stroke, and horsepower, including the DB 603 and DB 605, but were generally similar to the pattern created with the DB 600.

Variants

DB 600 A/B 1,000 PS (986 hp, 735 kW) at 2,400 rpm at sea level with 5-minute Kurzleistung (short term output)
DB 600Aa
DB 600 C/D 850 PS (838 hp, 625 kW) at 2,250 rpm at sea level with 1-minute Erhöhte Kurzleistung
DB 600 Ga/Ha 1,050 PS (1,036 hp, 772 kW) at 2,400 rpm at sea level with 1-minute Erhöhte Kurzleistung

Note:
DB 600 A/C/Ga with a reduction gearing of 1.55
DB 600 B/D/Ha with a reduction gearing of 1.88

Source:
 Luftfahrt-Lehrbücherei, Band 21, Die Deutschen Flugmotoren: DB 600, Berlin, 1940

Applications

 Arado Ar 197 V1. 1937 prototype - naval variant of Arado Ar 68.
 Dornier Do 17 S-0 Three pre-production aircraft.
 Focke-Wulf Fw 57
 Focke-Wulf Fw 187 V6.
 Heinkel He 60C One test aircraft.
 Heinkel He 111 V5: DB 600A, B-1, B-2: DB 600C, G-4: DB 600G,  G-5: DB 600C, J-1: DB 600C
 Heinkel He 112 V7, V8.
 Heinkel He 114 Three He 114 B-2 exported to Romania.
 Junkers Ju 90 V1.
 Henschel Hs 128 V1. Twin engine, pressurised cockpit, high-altitude research aircraft.
 Messerschmitt Bf 109 V10 through V14. Prototypes.
 Messerschmitt Bf 110 V1, V2, V3. Prototypes.
 Messerschmitt Bf 162 V1, V2.

Specifications (DB 600C/D)

See also

References

Bibliography

 Green, William. The Augsburg Eagle: A Documentary History - Messerschmitt Bf 109. London: Macdonald and Jane's Publishing Group. 1980. 
 Smith, J R and Kay, Anthony L. German Aircraft of the Second World War. London: Putman & Company. 1972 
 Neil Gregor Daimler-Benz in the Third Reich. Yale University Press, 1998

External links

 Aviation History.com, DB 600 series page

Daimler-Benz aircraft engines
1930s aircraft piston engines
Inverted V12 aircraft engines